Lake Saltonstall (Lonotonoquet in Quinnipiac), is a long narrow lake located in south-central Connecticut. The lake is surrounded by forest and serves as part of the local water supply for surrounding towns.

The lake and the area around it is owned by the South Central Connecticut Regional Water Authority, a company which also regulates fishing and rents boats. Private boats are not allowed. A Regional Water Authority (RWA) recreation permit may be purchased, which provides access to hiking trails, fishing and boat rentals at Lake Saltonstall and other properties owned and maintained by the RWA.

There are a variety of fish native to Lake Saltonstall in addition to those that are stocked by the RWA. Fish in Lake Saltonstall include largemouth bass, smallmouth bass, black crappie, walleye, trout, yellow perch and carp.

Interstate 95 runs across the southern edge of the lake, connecting the towns of East Haven, Connecticut and Branford, Connecticut.

References

External links
Lake Saltonstall Website
 SCCRWA Lake Saltonstall map and brochure.

Branford, Connecticut
East Haven, Connecticut
Lakes of New Haven County, Connecticut
Reservoirs in Connecticut
Metacomet Ridge, Connecticut